Bullitt Group Ltd is a British-based international mobile phone and consumer electronics business.  Founded in 2009 by Colin Batt, David Floyd and Richard Wharton; Bullitt designs, manufactures, markets, and sells consumer electronic devices in partnership with global brands.  It is the worldwide licensee of Caterpillar Inc. for 'rugged' mobile devices and accessories, and Motorola for outdoor-orientated consumer electronics.

Bullitt's products are sold in more than 75 countries, and the company has a presence in key markets around the world, including China (Shenzhen), the United Kingdom (Reading), and the United States of America (New York).  Manufacturing is primarily in China.

Growth and development
Founded in the United Kingdom (UK) in 2009, Bullitt Group Ltd opened international operations in China in 2010, and in the USA in 2012.  Bullitt's first licence was with JCB mobile devices, and in February 2012, the company became the worldwide licensee of Caterpillar Inc. for mobile devices and accessories.  Licences for Ted Baker (high quality, design-led audio devices), and Kodak (easy to use smartphones) soon followed.  Most recently, Bullitt Group Ltd became a global licensee for the Ministry of Sound to develop a range of headphones and connected audio devices that was to launch in May 2015.  Around May 2016, it partnered with Bullitt Group Lltd to launch a portfolio of mobile devices and peripherals.

In May 2016, Bullitt announced a partnership with Land Rover which will bring about the development of a new portfolio of mobile devices and peripherals.

In February 2021, Motorola partnered with Bullitt Group to develop Moto-branded rugged phones which will be drop-proof and shockproof.

See also
TUFF Phones

References

External links
Bullitt-Group.com — official website
CAT Phones website
Land Rover Explore website

British companies established in 2009
Manufacturing companies established in 2009
Telecommunications companies of the United Kingdom
Manufacturing companies of the United Kingdom
Mobile phone manufacturers
Smartphones
Companies based in Reading, Berkshire
British brands
Land Rover
Cat phone
Science and technology in the United Kingdom